Patrick Lukiki 'Tyson' Mulamba (born 3 May 1982 in Kinshasa, Zaire) is a Congolese rugby union player, currently playing with South African side the . His regular position is prop.

Career

Border Bulldogs

Mighty Elephants

He was included in their squad for the 2010 Vodacom Cup, but failed to make any appearances. In April 2010, he was released by the province to join amateur club side Zwide.

Raiders / Golden Lions

Mulamba returned to Gauteng and joined club side Raiders. Raiders qualified for the inaugural SARU Community Cup competition in 2013, with Mulamba starting all four of their matches and scoring a try in their derby match against Roodepoort in a 24–27 defeat.

He was named in their squad for the 2014 Currie Cup Premier Division, but failed to make an appearance.

References

South African rugby union players
Living people
1982 births
Sportspeople from Kinshasa
Rugby union props
Border Bulldogs players
Golden Lions players
Democratic Republic of the Congo rugby union players
Democratic Republic of the Congo emigrants to South Africa